Heidkopf (Spessart) is a wooded hill of Bavaria, Germany, located in the Mittelgebirge Spessart.

It reaches an elevation of up to 372 metres above NHN. The peak lies in the district of Aschaffenburg/Bavaria, but the border to Hesse passes over the hill, so part of it lies in the Main-Kinzig-Kreis.

External links

Hills of Bavaria
Aschaffenburg (district)
Main-Kinzig-Kreis
Hills of the Spessart